This is a list of listed buildings in Skanderborg Municipality, Denmark.

The list

References

External links
 Danish Agency of Culture

 
Skanderborg